Ahmad ibn Muhammad can refer to:

 Ahmad ibn Muhammad, famously known as Al-Musta'in was the Abbasid Caliph from 862 to 866.
 Abu Ibrahim Ahmad ibn Muhammad, Abbasid vassal Emir of Ifriqiya (856–863)
 Abu al-Abbas Ahmad ibn Muhammad ibn Kathir al-Farghani, (died 860s) also known as Alfraganus in the West, was an astronomer in the Abbasid court in Baghdad, and one of the most famous astronomers in the 9th century.
 Abu Ja'far Ahmad ibn Muhammad, Saffarid emir (923–963)
 Ahmad ibn Muhammad al-Thalabi, (died 1035/1036) was an eleventh-century Islamic scholar
 Ahmad ibn Muhammad Sajawandi, (died 1176 CE or 571 AH) was a 12th-century chronicler, commentator on the Quran, poet and orator. He was the son of the Islamic scholar Muhammad ibn Tayfour Sajawandi.
 Abu al-Abbas Ahmad ibn Muhammad Sultan of Morocco reigned from 1526 – 1545, 1547 – 1549.
 Ahmed ibn Mohammed al-Maqqari, (b. 1577–d. 1632) was a Muslim scholar, biographer and historian who is best known for his Nafḥ al-ṭīb a compendium of the history of Al-Andalus.
 Ahmed ibn Muhammad ibn Khalifa, (died 18 July 1795) also known as Ahmed al-Fateh was the progenitor of the ruling Al Khalifa dynasty of Bahrain and the first monarch of Bahrain (1783–1795).
 Ahmed Bey ben Mohamed Chérif, Bey of Constantine (1826–1848)